Łazowert (archaic feminine: Łazowertówna (unmarried), Łazowertówa (married) is a Polish-language Yiddish surname. Other variants of the surname include Lasowert and Lazovert. Notable people with this surname include:

Henryka Łazowertówna (1909-1942), Polish Jewish poet
 ( (1885-1937)) Polish Jewish revolutionary active in Poland and Soviet Russia, "Old Boshevik" 
 (1887-1976), Russian doctor of Polish Jewish descent and conspirator in assacination of Vladimir Rasputin

Polish-language surnames
Yiddish-language surnames